"You & I" (Korean: 너랑 나; RR: Neorang Na) is a song recorded in Korean and Japanese by South Korean singer IU from her second Korean-language studio album Last Fantasy (2011). The Korean version was released on November 29, 2011 through LOEN Entertainment, and was written and produced by Kim Eana and Lee Min-soo, respectively. The song was a huge domestic success, achieving the top spot on the Gaon Digital Chart and went on to sell more 7,000,000 digital units by 2021. According to Gaon, "You & I" is the second best-selling single in South Korea since 2010, ranking only behind Busker Busker's "Cherry Blossom Ending" (2012).

In Japan, "You & I" was released as a standalone single through EMI Music Japan on July 18, 2012, serving as her second single in the country. It was physically distributed in three formats: a standard CD and two CD + DVD limited edition bundles. Commercially, "You & I" performed rather moderately in Japan compared to its performance in the singer's native country, where it peaked at number five on the Oricon Singles Chart and number eleven on the Billboard Japan Hot 100, selling 18,000 copies.

Background and composition
The Korean version of "You and I" was released on November 29, 2011 as the lead single off of IU's second studio-album Last Fantasy through LOEN Entertainment. A Japanese version of the single was released in Japan on July 18, 2012.  It was physically distributed in three versions: a CD-only regular edition and limited editions CD+DVD A and CD+DVD B.

The song was composed by Lee Min-Soo and written by Kim Eana. The song possesses a mystic and peculiar concept, with IU playing the role of a teenage girl traveling through time in order to reach the future to meet her boyfriend. Switching to and from the minor and major keys, the arrangement is noteworthy for its diverse and fantasy-like atmosphere, incorporating instrumentals that are rarely used in K-pop, such as the harp and horn.

Reception
The song was a commercial success in South Korea, debuting atop the Gaon Digital Chart with first-week digital sales totaling 1,129,761 units. It stayed at the summit for two more weeks. The song also achieved the number one position on the Billboard K-pop Hot 100 for five consecutive weeks, becoming IU's first number one song on the K-pop Hot 100 and became the longest running number-one song on the chart. In the United States, the song marked IU's first entry onto the US Billboard World Digital Song Sales chart, peaking at number 3 in the week of December 16, 2011, and charted for six weeks.

Music video and promotion
On November 28, 2011, the music video for "You and I" was uploaded to LOEN Entertainment's official YouTube channel, one day prior to the release of Last Fantasy. The music video stars actor Lee Hyun-woo and tells the story of a girl (played by IU) traveling into the future in order to meet her boyfriend. The 19 year-old IU is shown to live with Hyunwoo—a boy who has fallen into deep sleep—in a workshop inside a clock tower inherited by her grandfather. IU does not leave his side and while waiting for him to wake up, decides to make a time machine in order to meet him. Both afraid yet excited, the long-awaited moment arrives as she leaves for her time machine as the two miss each other. Hyunwoo wakes up the moment he reaches age 20.

IU promoted the song on several South Korean music programs throughout December and early January, including Music Bank, Inkigayo, and Music on Top. She received 10 music show wins during the course "You & I" promotions, including a "triple crown", or three total wins, on Inkigayo.

Accolades

Track listing

Chart performance

Weekly charts

Year-end charts

Sales

Release history

References

2011 songs
2011 singles
IU (singer) songs